The Lafayette Lodge No. 79, at 3867 Northpoint Dr. in Zanesville, Ohio, was built in 1991.

It is home of Masonic local chapter, La Fayette Lodge No. 79 F&AM and The Lodge of Amity No. 5, F&AM.

Further information about the building is available within the Ohio Historic Places Dictionary.

References

External links

Masonic buildings in Ohio
National Register of Historic Places in Muskingum County, Ohio
Buildings and structures completed in 1857